Estádio Cidade de Coimbra is a stadium in Coimbra, Portugal. This stadium belongs to the Municipality of Coimbra and is mainly used by the Académica de Coimbra's football team.

The stadium was rebuilt, expanded, and modernized to host some UEFA Euro 2004 matches. Far beyond the sports stadium itself, all the project, called Euro Stadium Project, included the possibility of organizing sports, culture, and commercial events, by the modernization of the entire Calhabé area in Coimbra.

On 29 October 2003, Académica de Coimbra played at home to Sport Lisboa e Benfica in the first official match in the remodelled stadium.

Features
Its design does not involve any historical or traditional references, as the idea was to create a new, contemporary image with glass façades and an aesthetic roof supported by elegant stands. The existing athletics track has been preserved for possible use as a multi-purpose facility in the future. The stadium was designed by the Portuguese architectural firm Plarq in association with KSS Design Group of London. The Plarq team was led by the architect António Monteiro.

The stadium has 29,744 seats, two-thirds of which are covered. The complex boasts a large press centre, a bar, kitchens, and a restaurant with a panoramic view of the pitch. The project of the stadium took advantage of old seats: of close to 15,000 (all seated), involved the planned remodelling of the tier which extends around the entire perimeter of the previous stands, and a second tier above that, in the form of a "U", opening onto the slopes of the city at the North end.

A multi-purpose pavilion, olympic swimming pools, healthclub, gym, offices and studio apartment residences were built in the surrounding area. The Alma Shopping, a shopping and leisure center built near the stadium, includes cinemas, underground car parking, restaurants, and several retail outlets.

Major events

UEFA Euro 2004
The stadium hosted two UEFA Euro 2004 Group B matches: England 3–0 Switzerland and Switzerland 1–3 France.  Curiously in both matches, the record for the European Championship's youngest goalscorer was broken, first by Wayne Rooney, then by Johan Vonlanthen.

Portugal national football team
The following national team matches were held in the stadium, both in its old and renovated shape.

Taça de Portugal final 
The stadium also hosted the 2020 Taça de Portugal Final between both O Clássico rivals Benfica vs Porto also replacing Estádio Nacional that was supposed to be held but the original final match venue was unable to host the match due to security reasons and avoid the crowds of spectators to break the COVID-19 pandemic chain.

Taça da Liga final

Concerts
In addition to football, the stadium is often used for concerts of international artists with capacity up to 50,000 people.

The stadium was inaugurated with a Rolling Stones concert on 27 September 2003, attended by over 50,000 people.

George Michael played there in 2007 during the 25 Live, with 39,639 spectators.

In 2010, U2 played two sold-out shows in the stadium during their U2 360° Tour.  Approximately 109,985 people attended the event.

On June 24, 2012, Madonna performed in front of 33,597 people as part of her MDNA Tour.

Coldplay will perform at the stadium on 17, 18, 20, & 21 May 2023 as part of their Music of the Spheres World Tour.

References

External links

 Académica de Coimbra's official website
 Estádio Cidade de Coimbra at Stadiumguide.com
 Estádio Cidade de Coimbra at ZeroZero

Buildings and structures in Coimbra
Sport in Coimbra
UEFA Euro 2004 stadiums
Cidade de Coimbra
Cidade de Coimbra
Swimming venues in Portugal
Sports venues completed in 2003